Hair Brained is a 2013 American fantasy comedy-drama film directed by Billy Kent and starring Brendan Fraser and Alex Wolff.

Cast
Brendan Fraser as Leo Searly
Alex Wolff as Eli Pettifog
Parker Posey as Sheila Pettifog
Julia Garner as Shauna Holder
Michael Oberholtzer as Laird
Greta Lee as Gertrude Lee
Teddy Bergman as Alan Warren
Robin de Jesús as Romeo Torres
Elisabeth Hower as Eve Hansen
Austin Pendleton as Dapper Man
Toby Huss as Whittman Moderator / Brad the Announcer
Josefina Scaglione as Camilla
Kimiko Glenn as Perky Girl
Fred Melamed as Benny Greenberg
Lizzy DeClement as Sophie Searly

Reception
On review aggregator Rotten Tomatoes, the film holds an approval rating of 22% based on 18 reviews, with an average rating of 3.89/10.  Christy Lemire of RogerEbert.com awarded the film one star.

References

External links
 
 

2010s fantasy comedy-drama films
American fantasy comedy-drama films
Films scored by the Newton Brothers
Vertical Entertainment films
2010s English-language films
2010s American films